David Alan Bird (born 26 December 1984) is an English footballer who played as a central midfielder. Bird holds the record for most Football League appearances for Cheltenham Town F.C., having made 289 League appearances for the club. He has previously played for Cheltenham Town, Kidderminster Harriers and Gloucester City.

Career
Born in Gloucester, Bird grew up in Cinderford attending Heywood School and playing for Cinderford Town from the age of 14. Bird was a member of the Cheltenham Town academy team and signed professionally in 2002. He made over 200 appearances for his club, his best season coming in 2007–08 where he had been a regular in the starting line-up and had scored four goals.

He holds the record for most league appearances for Cheltenham Town F.C., having made 289 League appearances for the club.

On 24 January 2012, Bird left Cheltenham Town by mutual consent. On 20 March 2012 Bird joined Conference North side Gloucester City on a short-term deal.

In July 2012, Bird was on trial with Hereford United although he eventually re-joined his boyhood club, Cinderford Town.

In April 2014, Bird was appointed player/assistant manager under John Brough.

In April 2016, Bird was playing for Gloucestershire County League team Broadwell Amateurs

External links
Dave Bird player profile at ctfc.com

Notes

1984 births
Living people
English footballers
People from Cinderford
Footballers from Gloucester
Cheltenham Town F.C. players
Kidderminster Harriers F.C. players
Association football midfielders
Gloucester City A.F.C. players
Cinderford Town A.F.C. players